Blue Rider is the fourth studio album by American musician Zachary Cale. It was released in September 2013 under Electric Ragtime Records & All Hands Electric in the US and JellyFant in Germany.

Track listing

References

2013 albums